Puvvada John was Bishop of Nandyal from 9 October 1977 to  24 August 1985.

John  was  ordained deacon in 1918 and priest in 1920. He worked within the Diocese of Dornakal and was Archdeacon of Nandyal from 1963 until his elevation to the Episcopate.

References

Archdeacons of Nandyal
Anglican bishops of Nandyal